is a railway station on the Yamada Line in the city of Miyako, Iwate, Japan, operated by East Japan Railway Company (JR East).

Lines
Kebaraichi Station is served by the Yamada Line, and is located 94.2 rail kilometers from the terminus of the line at Morioka Station.

Station layout
Kebaraichi Station has a single side platform serving a single bi-directional track. There is no station building, but only a waiting room built on the platform. The station is unattended.

History
Kebaraichi Station opened on 20 December 1961. The station was absorbed into the JR East network upon the privatization of the Japanese National Railways (JNR) on 1 April 1987.

Surrounding area
  Japan National Route 106

See also
 List of railway stations in Japan

References

External links

  

Railway stations in Iwate Prefecture
Yamada Line (JR East)
Railway stations in Japan opened in 1961
Miyako, Iwate
Stations of East Japan Railway Company